Nocilla is a Spanish brand of hazelnut and chocolate spread similar to Nutella. It is sold in Spain and Portugal, was first launched in the late 1960s, and after its acquisition from Unilever in 2002 has been manufactured by Nutrexpa.

Slogan 
Leche, cacao, avellanas y azúcar... ¡¡No-ci-lla!!: "Milk, cocoa, hazelnuts and sugar... No-ci-lla!!"

History 
At the end of the 1960s, the Starlux group was inspired by a product of the Italian Ferrero group, the Nutella spreadable cream, to develop its own product for the Spanish market. Nocilla dough has a third less hazelnut paste than Nutella. Nocilla's first slogan was ¡Qué snack! To make itself known among young people, Nocilla sponsored sports camps, children's events and bet heavily on advertising. In this way, Nocilla positioned itself as the main brand in its sector.

In 1997, Starlux shareholders sold the firm to the Knorr group, which later passed into the hands of the Anglo-Dutch multinational Unilever. Five years later, the owners sold the brand to Grupo Nutrexpa, known for being the manufacturer of Cola Cao. Under their management, Nocilla launched new flavors and other products, such as buns. After the division of Nutrexpa into two companies in 2014 and the distribution of the products of the old Nutrexpa between the two new companies that began operating in 2015, Nocilla was under the ownership of Idilia Foods, which is the one who manufactures it today.

See also
 List of spreads

References

External links 
Official website
Brand information at Nutrexpa site.

Spreads (food)
Spanish brands
Spanish cuisine
Products introduced in 1967
Brand name condiments
Brand name chocolate